This article is about the particular significance of the decade 1740 - 1749 to Wales and its people.

Incumbents
Prince of Wales - Frederick
Princess of Wales - Augusta

Events
1740 in Wales
1741 in Wales
1742 in Wales
1743 in Wales
1744 in Wales
1745 in Wales
1746 in Wales
1747 in Wales
1748 in Wales
1749 in Wales

Arts and literature

New books
1740
John Dyer - The Ruins of Rome
Griffith Jones (Llanddowror) - Welsh Piety
Zachariah Williams - The Mariners Compass Completed
1742

1744
Jane Brereton - Poems on several occasions (posthumously published)
1746
Anna Williams - Life of the Emperor Julian (translation from the French)
1749
Zachariah Williams - A True Narrative of certain Circumstances relating to Zachariah Williams in the Charterhouse

Music
1740
Howell Harris - Llyfr o Hymneu o Waith Amryw Awdwyr (collection of hymns)
1742
Howell Harris & Daniel Rowland - Sail, Dibenion, a Rheolau'r Societies (collection of hymns)
1744
William Williams Pantycelyn - Aleluia (hymns: first part)

Births
1740
date unknown - Sir Watkin Lewes, politician (d. 1821)
1741
January 16 - Hester Thrale, diarist and friend of Dr Johnson (d. 1821)
August 20 - Henry Herbert, 1st Earl of Carnarvon (d. 1811)
September 3 - Owen Jones, antiquary (d. 1814)
1742
September 26 - Thomas Jones, landscape painter (d. 1803)
December 3 - Sir Erasmus Gower, naval commander (d. 1814)
1745
February 14 - David Davis (Castellhywel), poet (d. 1827)
1746
September 28 - William Jones, philologist (d. 1794)
1747
January - Richard Fenton, poet and author (d. 1821)
1748
September 1 - Thomas Johnes, landowner (d. 1816)
1749
September 23 - Sir Watkin Williams-Wynn, 4th Baronet, politician (d. 1789)

Deaths
1740
August 7 - Jane Brereton, poet, 55
October 20 - Sir William Williams, 2nd Baronet, of Gray's Inn, politician, 75?
1741
August - David Owen, 29 ("David of the White Rock"), harpist,
date unknown
Wil Hopcyn, poet, 41?
Robert Roberts, theologian, 61?
1743
July 15 - John Wynne, bishop, 83?
date unknown
Thomas Morgan, Deist theologian
Robert Wynne, clergyman and academic
1744
March 2 - William Maxwell, 5th Earl of Nithsdale, Jacobite, husband of Winifred Herbert
1745
May 7 - Sir Thomas Hanmer, politician and literary editor, 68
1746
May 21 - Lewis Morris, Welsh-descended Governor of New Jersey, 74
1748
August 27 - Sir Robert Salusbury Cotton, 3rd Baronet, 53
1749
May - Winifred Herbert, Countess of Nithsdale, 58?
August - Angharad James, poet, 72
September 26 - Sir Watkin Williams-Wynn, 3rd Baronet, 57

 
18th century in Wales
Wales
Wales
Decades in Wales